When Last I Died is a 1941 mystery detective novel by the British writer Gladys Mitchell. It is the thirteenth in her long-running series featuring the psychoanalyst and amateur detective Mrs Bradley. In a review in The Observer, Maurice Richardson described it as "perhaps Miss Mitchell’s best, most ingenious crime story yet."

Synopsis
After renting a house by the seaside Mrs Bradley comes across the diary of a former tenant in the house Bella Foxley, once accused of murdering her cousin some years before. Convinced that Bella was unfairly accused, Mrs Bradley takes it upon herself to investigate a supposedly haunted house where the murder has taken place.

References

Bibliography
 Klein, Kathleen Gregory. Great Women Mystery Writers: Classic to Contemporary. Greenwood Press, 1994.
 Miskimmin, Esme. 100 British Crime Writers. Springer Nature, 2020.
 Reilly, John M. Twentieth Century Crime & Mystery Writers. Springer, 2015.

1941 British novels
Novels by Gladys Mitchell
British crime novels
British mystery novels
British thriller novels
Novels set in England
British detective novels
Michael Joseph books